Evolution & Development is a peer-reviewed scientific journal publishing material at the interface of evolutionary and developmental biology. Within evolutionary developmental biology, it has the aim of aiding a broader synthesis of biological thought in these two areas. Its scope ranges from paleontology and population biology, to developmental and molecular biology, including mathematics and the history and philosophy of science.

It was established in 1999 by five biologists: Wallace Arthur, Sean B. Carroll, Michael Coates, Rudolf Raff, and Gregory Wray.  It is published by Wiley-Blackwell on behalf of the Society for Integrative and Comparative Biology.

References

External links 
 

Evolutionary biology journals
Publications established in 1999
Developmental biology
Wiley-Blackwell academic journals
English-language journals
Bimonthly journals